James Trend (2 November 1878 – 17 February 1954) was an Australian rules footballer who played with Melbourne in the Victorian Football League (VFL).

Notes

External links 
 
 

1878 births
1954 deaths
Australian rules footballers from Victoria (Australia)
Melbourne Football Club players